Zakouski is a ballet made by New York City Ballet ballet master in chief Peter Martins to: 
 Vocalise, Op. 34, No. 14 by Sergei Rachmaninoff
 "Parasha's Song" from the opera Mavra by Igor Stravinsky
 The fourth of Cinq Melodies by Sergei Prokofiev
 Valse-Scherzo, Op. 34 by Pyotr Ilyich Tchaikovsky.

The premiere took place on Tuesday, 17 November 1992 at the New York State Theater, Lincoln Center. It was the first role made on Nikolaj Hübbe at City Ballet; he chose to dance it as well at his farewell performance on Sunday, 10 February 2008, at which time he and Yvonne Borree divided the pas de deux with Megan Fairchild and Andrew Veyette, who were dancing it for the first time.

Original cast
Margaret Tracey
Nikolaj Hübbe

Reviews 
NY Times review by Anna Kisselgoff, February 23, 1993
NY Times review by Jack Anderson, June 25, 2004

References 
Playbill, New York City Ballet, Thursday, January 3
Repertory Week, New York City Ballet, Winter Season, 2008 repertory, week 1

Ballets by Peter Martins
Ballets to the music of Sergei Rachmaninoff
Ballets to the music of Igor Stravinsky
Ballets to the music of Sergei Prokofiev
Ballets to the music of Pyotr Ilyich Tchaikovsky
1992 ballet premieres
New York City Ballet repertory